Mengcun is a Hui autonomous county of southeastern Hebei province, China, under the administration of Cangzhou City.

Administrative divisions
There are 4 towns and 2 townships under the county's administration.

Towns:
Mengcun, Xinxian, Xindian, Gaozhai

Townships:
Songzhuangzi Township, Niujinzhuang Township

Climate

References

County-level divisions of Hebei
Hui autonomous counties
Cangzhou